John Beardsley may refer to
John Beardsley (cleric) (1732–1808), Canadian clergyman
John Beardsley (colonel) (1816–1906), Union Army colonel
John Beardsley (New York politician) (1783–1857), American politician